Pietro Aldobrandini (31 March 1571 – 10 February 1621) was an Italian cardinal and patron of the arts.

Biography
He was made a cardinal in 1593 by his uncle, Pope Clement VIII. He took over the duchy of Ferrara in 1598 when it fell to the Papal States. 
On 17 Oct 1604, he was consecrated bishop by Pope Clement VIII, with François-Marie Tarugi, Archbishop of Siena, Alessandro Ottaviano de' Medici, Cardinal-Bishop of Palestrina, and Ottavio Bandini, Archbishop of Fermo, serving as co-consecrators.
He became archbishop of Ravenna in 1604.

He bought the Palazzo Doria Pamphilj, and spent large sums on this and other buildings such as the Villa Aldobrandini. He was a patron of Torquato Tasso, and of Girolamo Frescobaldi.

Works

References

Bibliography
Asano Guarini, E. F (1960). "Aldobrandini, Pietro," in: Dizionario Biografico degli italiani, 2, Roma 1960, pp. 107-112.

1571 births
1621 deaths
17th-century Italian cardinals
Cardinal-bishops of Sabina
17th-century Italian Roman Catholic archbishops
Archbishops of Ravenna
Cardinal-nephews
Cardinal Secretaries of State
Major Penitentiaries of the Apostolic Penitentiary
Camerlengos of the Holy Roman Church
Clergy from Rome
16th-century Italian cardinals